Steven Randall "Randy" Jackson (born October 29, 1961) is an American singer-songwriter, musician, and dancer. Randy is best known as a former member of his family band the Jacksons. Randy is the youngest Jackson brother and the second-youngest Jackson sibling before his sister Janet Jackson. He is the ninth child in the Jackson family.

Early life
 Randy was born at St Mary's Mercy Hospital in Gary, Indiana to Joseph Jackson and Katherine Jackson. Nicknamed "Little Randy", Jackson is the ninth child of the Jackson family and youngest of the brothers. Jackson was only two years old when the Jackson 5 was formed and thus not an original member. While Randy's brothers toured, Jackson honed his skills as a musician, mastering piano and the bongos.

Career

The Jacksons

Randy was not an original member of the Jackson 5, first appearing live with his brothers in 1971 at a Christmas show the Jackson 5 held for blind children. Although he was on every Jackson 5 tour since 1972, mainly playing the congas among other instruments, Randy did not officially join the family band until 1975 when they left Motown for CBS Records and older brother Jermaine chose to stay with Motown, prompting Randy to replace him. The Jackson 5 officially changed their name to the Jacksons when they signed with Epic in part because Motown owned the name "Jackson 5". At age 16, he co-wrote the Jacksons' most successful single on Epic, "Shake Your Body (Down to the Ground)" with Michael.

On March 3, 1980, Jackson was seriously injured in a car crash in Hollywood, California. In June 1980, he appeared on the cover of the weekly African-American newsmagazine Jet. The cover headline read: "Randy Jackson Walks Again: Talks About His Future."

Jackson plays congas, percussion, keyboards, piano, bass, and guitar, among other instruments. In addition to singing and playing on the Jacksons' recordings, he worked with Michael on his album Off the Wall. He participated in the Jacksons' Destiny World Tour from 1979 to 1980, the Triumph Tour in 1981, Victory Tour in 1984, and the band's later projects. After the Victory Tour, Jackson worked with Lionel Richie on his album Dancing On The Ceiling in 1985. Jackson, along with brothers Jackie, Tito, Marlon, and his sister La Toya joined USA For Africa to sing in "We Are The World", which was led by Jackson’s brother Michael, Lionel Richie, Quincy Jones, and Harry Belafonte.

He was left out when the Jackson 5 were inducted to the Rock and Roll Hall of Fame in 1997; only the five original members were inducted.

He was part of the Jacksons' 2001 reunion at Madison Square Garden, but did not appear as an official cast member in their 2009 A&E reality series The Jacksons: A Family Dynasty. He did contribute backing vocals with Jackie, Tito, Marlon and Jermaine for Michael's "This Is It".

After the Jacksons
After recording 2300 Jackson Street, the group disbanded and focused on separate projects in 1990. After this split, Jackson formed his own band, Randy & the Gypsys. The group released only one album before breaking up. The same year, he co-founded Total Multimedia Inc. with former Iron Butterfly bass player Philip Taylor Kramer to develop data compression techniques for CD-ROMs. On June 28, 1998, Jackson opened up his own record label, Modern Records.

Rhythm Nation Records
Randy is currently a co-partner with his sister, Janet Jackson, at her independent record label Rhythm Nation Records. On August 16, 2018, Randy and Janet announced that Rhythm Nation Records was partnering with independent music publisher, distributor and label Cinq Music. On August 17, 2018, Janet Jackson's "Made for Now" was released, co-written by Randy.

Personal life

Family
In the 1980s, Jackson dated Bernadette Swann (née Robi), Lynn Swann's ex-wife. Swann alleged that Jackson was physically abusive, so she sought refuge at the home of her friend Tina Turner (Swann previously dated Turner's son). Turner shot at Jackson after he broke into her home to see Swann. Turner decided not to press charges in order to avoid bad press.

In 1986, Jackson met Alejandra Oaziaza. They dated for several years, and have two children together:

 Genevieve Jackson (born December 3, 1989).
 Steven Randall Jackson Jr. (born October 3, 1992).

Oaziaza married and divorced Randy Jackson's brother Jermaine Jackson. Randy Jackson married Eliza Shaffy in August 1989; they divorced in 1992. They have a daughter together, Stevanna Jackson (born June 17, 1990).

Michael Jacksons's memorial
Michael Jackson's memorial service was held at the Staples Center on Tuesday, July 7, 2009. To honor him, Randy and his brothers Marlon, Jackie, Jermaine and Tito served as pallbearers wearing a single spangly white glove and sunglasses.

Legal issues

Battery charge
In January 1991, Jackson was charged with battery for beating his wife Eliza Shaffy and their 7-month-old daughter Stevanna. He pleaded no contest to the charge, was placed on two years' probation and ordered to enroll in a domestic violence program, but didn't comply. In November 1991, Jackson was arrested after Shaffy phoned the police to report that the beatings did not stop. He was sentenced to 30 days in a mental hospital, Pine Grove Hospital, in Canoga Park and ordered to serve the remainder of his probation and enroll in a year-long domestic violence rehabilitation program. Disappointed that Jackson received no jail time, Shaffy filed for divorce.

Bankruptcy
Jackson filed for bankruptcy in 1996. He was ordered to surrender his shares in Modern Records Inc. In May 1998, an arrest warrant was issued when Jackson failed to turn over the stock. In 2001, he pleaded guilty to bankruptcy fraud by failing to list all his vehicular assets.

Child support
In January 2012, Jackson filed a complaint against Oaziaza, disputing an alleged $500,000 owed in child support. He claimed he had never been served for the initial paternity lawsuit, instead claiming that the matter had been settled in 1993. His absence at the paternity proceedings resulted in a default judgment in Oaziaza's favor.

Disputed will and child custody
Randy attempted to unseat executors John Branca and John McClain and dismiss the will of his brother Michael, which reportedly made their mother Katherine furious. He, Jermaine and Janet objected to the 2011 tribute concert held for Michael, stating that they felt the family's attention should have been focused on Conrad Murray's trial.

The three siblings were later involved in an event where Katherine lost custody of Michael's children due to suspicion that she was "prevented from acting as a guardian because of the acts of third parties". Randy, Jermaine, and Janet attempted to take the children with them to Arizona, where it was alleged that Katherine was being held against her will after being kidnapped. Footage of the event appeared to show the siblings storming the house and Janet trying to take Paris's phone. Sheriff's deputies broke up an altercation between Randy, Jermaine and Trent (Katherine's nephew-in-law and paternal cousin of Randy and Jermaine). In the end, the court ordered that Katherine would share custody of Prince, Paris, and Bigi ("Blanket") with their cousin, TJ Jackson, the then 34-year-old son of Tito Jackson.

Discography

Singles

with Randy and the Gypsys

Studio albums

Singles

Promotional singles

References

External links
Jackson Source: Randy Jackson

1961 births
Living people
20th-century American drummers
20th-century American guitarists
20th-century American keyboardists
20th-century American singers
21st-century American drummers
21st-century American guitarists
21st-century American keyboardists
21st-century American singers
African-American male guitarists
African-American male singers
African-American male singer-songwriters
African-American pianists
American funk bass guitarists
American funk guitarists
American funk keyboardists
American male bass guitarists
American male drummers
American male guitarists
American male pianists
American male pop singers
American male singer-songwriters
American multi-instrumentalists
American people who self-identify as being of Native American descent
American percussionists
American rhythm and blues bass guitarists
American rhythm and blues guitarists
American rhythm and blues keyboardists
American rhythm and blues musicians
American rhythm and blues singers
Child pop musicians
Conga players
Epic Records artists
Guitarists from Indiana
Randy Jackson
Male bass guitarists
Musicians from Gary, Indiana
People convicted of battery
Singer-songwriters from Indiana
The Jackson 5 members